Paracomitas flemingi is an extinct species of sea snail, a marine gastropod mollusk in the family Pseudomelatomidae, the turrids and allies.

Distribution
This extinct marine species was endemic to New Zealand.

References

 Beu A.G. (1970). Bathyal Upper Miocene Mollusca from Wairarapa District, New Zealand. Transactions of the Royal Society of New Zealand, Earth Sciences. 7(12): 209-240
 Maxwell, P.A. (2009). Cenozoic Mollusca. pp. 232–254 in Gordon, D.P. (ed.) New Zealand inventory of biodiversity. Volume one. Kingdom Animalia: Radiata, Lophotrochozoa, Deuterostomia. Canterbury University Press, Christchurch

flemingi
Gastropods described in 1970
Gastropods of New Zealand